Eugène Nielen Marais (9 January 1871 – 29 March 1936) was a South African lawyer, naturalist, and highly important writer and Poète maudit in the Second Language Movement of Afrikaans literature. Since his death by his own hand, Marais has been widely hailed as a literary and scientific genius and a cultural hero of the Afrikaner people.

His early years, before and during the Boer War 
Marais was born in Pretoria, the thirteenth and last child of Jan Christiaan Nielen Marais and Catharina Helena Cornelia van Niekerk. He attended school in Pretoria, Boshof and Paarl, and much of his early education was in English, as were his earliest poems. He matriculated at the age of sixteen.

His family fluently spoke Afrikaans, Dutch, and English. In Marais' early teens, he started writing English poetry and greedily devoured the verse of William Shakespeare, John Milton, Robert Burns, the Lake poets, and the English Romantics.

After leaving school, he worked in Pretoria as a legal clerk and then as a journalist before becoming owner (at the age of twenty) of a newspaper called Land en Volk (Country and (the Afrikaner) People). He involved himself deeply in local politics. In his role as a journalist and newspaper editor, Marais became a vocal critic of Paul Kruger, the widely revered President of the Republic of Transvaal, which made Marais a very unpopular figure.

He began taking opiates at an early age and graduated to morphine (then considered to be non-habit forming and safe) very soon thereafter. He became addicted, and his drug addiction ruled his affairs and actions to a greater or lesser extent throughout his life. When asked why he took drugs, he variously pleaded ill health, insomnia and, later, the death of his young wife as a result of the birth of his only child. Much later, he blamed accidental addiction while ill with malaria in Mozambique. Some claim his use of drugs was experimental and influenced by the philosophy of de Quincey.

Marais married Aletta "Lettie" Beyers (1871-1895), about whom he wrote in a letter to a friend: "She is just about the most perfect female in body and mind that God ever planted in South Africa." Shortly after the birth of a son, and eleven months into the marriage, she died from puerperal fever, purportedly caused by the inebriated doctor who attended the birth. The child, Eugène Charles Gerard Marais (1895-1977) was Marais' only child. The death devastated Marais and caused him to sink further into morphine addiction.

In 1897 — still in his mid-twenties – Marais went to London to read medicine. However, under pressure from his friends, he entered the Inner Temple to study law. He qualified as an advocate. When the Boer War broke out in 1899, he was put on parole as an enemy alien in London. During the latter part of the war he joined a German expedition that sought to ship ammunition and medicines to the Boer Commandos via Portuguese East Africa. However, he was struck down there by malaria and, before the supplies could be delivered to the Boers, the war ended in 1902.

After the war 
Marais switched from composing poetry in English to composing in Afrikaans during the despondent era that followed the British defeat and conquest of the two Boer Republics. As the leader of the Second Afrikaans Language Movement, Marais work was translated into various languages either late in his life or after his death.

From 1905 Marais studied nature in the Waterberg ('Water Mountain'), a wilderness area north of Pretoria, and wrote in his native Afrikaans about the animals he observed. His studies of termites led him to conclude that the colony ought to be considered as a single organism, a prescient insight that predated the elaboration of the idea by Richard Dawkins. In the Waterberg, Marais also studied the black mamba, spitting cobra and puff adder. Moreover, he observed a specific troop of baboons at length, and from these studies there sprang numerous magazine articles and the books My Friends the Baboons and The Soul of the Ape. He is acknowledged as the father of the scientific study of the behaviour of animals, known as Ethology.

His book Die Siel van die Mier (The Soul of the Ant,  but usually given in English as the Soul of the White Ant) was plagiarised by Nobel laureate Maurice Maeterlinck, who published La Vie des Termites (translated into English as The Life of Termites or The Life of  White Ants), an entomological book, in what has been called "a classic example of academic plagiarism" by University of London's professor of biology, David Bignell.

Marais accused Maeterlinck of having used his concept of the "organic unity" of the termitary in his book. Marais had published his ideas on the termitary in the South African Afrikaans-language press, both in Die Burger in January 1923 and in Huisgenoot, which featured a series of articles on termites under the title "Die Siel van die Mier" (The Soul of the (White) Ant) from 1925 to 1926. Maeterlinck's book, with almost identical content, was published in 1926. It is alleged that Maeterlinck had come across Eugene Marais' series of articles, and that it would have been easy for Maeterlinck to translate from Afrikaans to French, since Maeterlinck knew Dutch and had already made several translations from Dutch into French before. It was common at the time for worthy articles published in Afrikaans to be reproduced in Flemish and Dutch magazines and journals.

Marais sent a letter to Dr. Winifred de Kock in London about Maeterlinck, in which he wrote that The famous author had paid me the left-handed compliment of cribbing the most important part of my work... He clearly desired his readers to infer that he had arrived at certain of my theories (the result of ten years of hard labour in the veld) by his own unaided reason, although he admits that he never saw a termite in his life. You must understand that it was not merely plagiarism of the spirit of a thing, so to speak. He has copied page after page verbally. 

Supported by a coterie of Afrikaner Nationalist friends, Marais sought justice through the South African press and attempted an international lawsuit. This was to prove financially impossible and the case was not pursued. However, Marais gained a measure of renown as the aggrieved party and as an Afrikaner researcher who had opened himself up to plagiarism because he published in Afrikaans out of nationalistic loyalty. Marais brooded at the time of the scandal: "I wonder whether Maeterlinck blushes when he reads such things [critical acclaim], and whether he gives a thought to the injustice he does to the unknown Boer worker?"

Maeterlinck's own words in The Life of Termites indicate that the possible discovery or accusation of plagiarism worried him:

It would have been easy, in regard to every statement, to allow the text to bristle with footnotes and references. In some chapters there is not a sentence but would have clamoured for these; and the letterpress would have been swallowed up by vast masses of comment, like one of those dreadful books we hated so much at school. There is a short bibliography at the end of the volume which will no doubt serve the same purpose.
Despite these misgivings, there is no reference to Eugène Marais in the bibliography. Maeterlinck's other works on entomology include The Life of the Ant (1930).

Professor VE d'Assonville wrote about Maeterlinck as "the Nobel Prize winner who had never seen a termite in his whole life and had never put a foot on the soil of Africa, least of all in the Waterberg.".

There is evidence  that Marais' time and research in the Waterberg brought him great peace and joy and provided him with artistic inspiration. In the poem Waar Tebes in die stil woestyn, he writes (as translated into English by J. W. Marchant) 'There would I know peace once more, where Tebes in the quiet desert lifts it mighty rockwork on high ...'. (Tebus is one of the principal peaks of the area). That said, Marais was a long-term morphine addict and suffered from melancholy, insomnia, depression and feelings of isolation.

Also while living in the Waterberg District, Marais' literary output was heavily influenced by, "the pure poetry," he learned from local San people, Nama people, Khoi people, and from Herero refugees from German Southwest Africa. Marais also collected a very large store of African folklore in the Waterberg District from an elderly San storyteller locally nicknamed Ou Hendrick. Marais published his stories in Afrikaans under the title Dwaalstories ("Wandering Stories").

Several years before his death, the Rev. A.J. Louw, an Afrikaner Calvinist dominee known as "The Pope of the Highveld", confronted Marais during a haus bezoek, or ministerial visitation, for believing in Darwinian evolution. Marais replied, "Don't pick on me, Dominee. It's a matter between you and the Almighty. I really had nothing to do with the creation of the Universe."

One of Marais' last poems, Diep Rivier ("Deep River"), is an ode to the drug morphine and was written ten years before its author's death by his own hand.

Death
On March 29, 1936, having been forsaken by his friends and family and deprived of morphine for several days, Marais borrowed a shotgun on the pretext of killing a snake and shot himself in the chest. The wound was not fatal, and Marais therefore put the gun barrel in his mouth and pulled the trigger.

Marais took his own life on the farm Pelindaba, which belonged to his friend Gustav Preller. For those who are familiar with the dark moods of certain of Marais' poems, there is a black irony there; in Zulu language, Pelindaba means 'the end of the business' – although the more common interpretation is 'Place of great gatherings'.

Robert Ardrey, an admirer of Eugène Marais's, attributed Marais' suicide to the theft of his intellectual property by Maeterlinck. Ardrey said in his introduction to The Soul of the Ape, published in 1969, that 'As a scientist he was unique, supreme in his time, yet a worker in a science unborn.' He also refers to Marais' work at length in his book African Genesis.

Eugéne Marais and his wife Aletta lie buried in the Heroes' Acre, Pretoria.

Legacy 
Marais' work as a naturalist, although by no means trivial (he was one of the first scientists to practise ethology and was repeatedly acknowledged as such by Robert Ardrey and others), gained less public attention and appreciation than his literary work. He discovered the Waterberg Cycad, which was named after him (Encephalartos eugene-maraisii).  He was the first person to study the behaviour of wild primates, and his observations continue to be cited in contemporary evolutionary biology. He is among the greatest of the Afrikaner poets and remains one of the most popular, although his output was not large. Opperman described him as the first professional poet in Afrikaans; Marais believed that poetic craft was every bit as important as inspiration. Along with J.H.H. de Waal and G.S. Preller, he was a leading light in the Second Afrikaans Language Movement in the period immediately after the Second Boer War, which ended in 1902. Some of his finest poems deal with the wonders of life and nature, but he also wrote about his own inexorable death. Marais was isolated due to some of his beliefs. He was a self-confessed pantheist and claimed that the only time he entered church buildings was for weddings. An assessment of Marais' status as an Afrikaner hero was published by historian Sandra Swart.

Marais was also fascinated by the folklore, cultures, and traditions of the Bantu peoples of the rural Transvaal; this is often seen in poems such as "Die Dans van die Reën" (The Dance of the Rain).

Since his death by his own hand, Eugène Marais has been cited as the prototype of the many dissident Afrikaans-speaking poets, writers, and intellectuals in South Africa under apartheid (1948-1994). At the beginning of his 1982 book, The Adversary Within: Dissident Writers in Afrikaans, Jack Cope explained that the famous confrontation between Eugène Marais and Rev. A.J. Louw is symptomatic of a much wider dispute in Afrikaner culture.

Many highly important figures in Afrikaans literature during the Apartheid felt similarly, according to André Brink, "torn between attachment to their language, situation, and people on the one hand and their desire to bring about innovations, which are rejected or misunderstood. The writers find themselves too far ahead of their people and may become isolated, aliens in their own land - the fate of Eugène Marais."

Poetry translations
The following translation of Marais' "Winternag" is by J. W. Marchant:

"Winter's Night"

O the small wind is frigid and spareand bright in the dim light and bareas wide as God's merciful boonthe veld lies in starlight and gloomand on the high landsspread through burnt bandsthe grass-seed, astir, is like beckoning hands.O East-wind gives mournful measure to songLike the lilt of a lovelorn lass who's been wrongedIn every grass foldbright dewdrop takes holdand promptly pales to frost in the cold!

While the above translation is generally faithful, and is a fine poem in English, it does not quite capture the terse directness of the Afrikaans language, which makes Afrikaans poetry so bittersweet and evocative, striking straight to the heart and soul. Below follows a translation by Farrell Hope, which may closer reflect the original Afrikaans idiom. Note the above version by J. W. Marchant, as well as the third version below by At de Lange, both translate the Afrikaans word in the poem skade (damage) as if it was skadu (shade).  This is a common error in translating the poem and misses the point Marais was making: that the British forces had destroyed the Boer farms.

"Winternight"

O cold is the slight wind,and keen.Bare and bright in dim lightis seen,as vast as the graces of God,the veld's starlit and fire-scarred sod.To the high edge of the lands,spread through the scorched sands,new seed-grass is stirringlike beckoning hands.

O mournful the tuneof the East-wind refrain,like the song of a girlwho loved but in vain.One drop of dew glistenson each grass-blade's foldand fast does it paleto frost in the cold!

An English translation by At de Lange preserves the musicality of the poem quite well:

"Winter's Night"

O cold is the windletand spare.And bright in the dim-lightand bare,as vast as God's mercy has bade,lie the plains in starlight and shade.And high in the ridges,spreaded in burnt ditches,are the grass plumes stirringlike beckoning hands.

O tune with grief ladenon the east wind's drone,like the song of a maidenin her love made alone.In each grass blade's folda drop of dew gleams bold,and it pales quicklyto frost in the cold!

Die Wonderwerker
This 2012 movie directed by Katinka Heyns explores Marais' convalescence from malaria on a farm in the Waterberg.

Cultural References
 Eugene Marais is fictionalised in Brian Catling's Vorrh trilogy in the last of the series, The Cloven.
 The Soul of the Ape is visible on the floor of the hotel room of the protagonist in the 1975 film The Passenger by Michelangelo Antonioni.
 The Soul of the Ape and The Soul of the Ant are both referenced in the book  The Soul of Viktor Tronko by David Quammen, published 1987

The Marais name 
The progenitors of the Marais name in the region were Charles and Claude Marais, from the Paris region of France. The Marais name has retained its original French spelling and pronunciation in South Africa.

See also 
 Afrikaans folklore
 Eugène Marais Prize

Bibliography 
 The Soul of the White Ant, 1937, first published as Die Siel van die Mier in 1925, in Afrikaans
 The Soul of the Ape, 1919, published posthumously in 1969.

Notes
  Ces Francais Qui Ont Fait L'Afrique Du Sud. Translation: The French People Who Made South Africa. Bernard Lugan. January 1996. '
  Opperman, D.J. Undated but probably 1962. Senior verseboek. Nasionale Boekhandel Bpk, Kaapstad. Negende druk, 185pp
  Schirmer, P. 1980. The concise illustrated South African encyclopaedia. Central News Agency, Johannesburg. First edition, about 212pp.
  Rousseau, Leon 1982, The Dark Stream—The Story of Eugène Marais. Jonathan Ball Publishers, JeppesTown.
  Hogan, C.Michael, Mark L. Cooke and Helen Murray, The Waterberg Biosphere, Lumina Technologies Inc, 22 May 2006. 
  Marais, Eugène, Soul of the Ape, Human and Rousseau (1937)
  Ardrey, Robert The Territorial Imperative: A Personal Inquiry into the Animal Origins of Property and Nations, 1966
  Van Niekerk, H. L. Eugène Marais: Nuwe Feite en Nuwe Inligting 2010 (Eugène Marais: New Facts and New Insights)

References

External links 
 Eugène Marais Foundation 
 Eugène Marais the Poet Some key poems by Eugène Marais (in Afrikaans)
 Encounter South Africa Article
 The Soul of the White Ant online pdf
 sahistory.org.za Entry on Eugene Marais
 Leon Rousseau, Eugène Marais: The great longing, Sunday Times, 24 September 2000

1871 births
1936 suicides
Afrikaans-language poets
Afrikaans-language writers
Afrikaner people
Collectors of fairy tales
English-language South African poets
Myrmecologists
Pantheists
People from Pretoria
Poètes maudits
South African entomologists
South African naturalists
South African writers
South African people of Dutch descent
Suicides by firearm in South Africa